Qarah Su (also Romanized as Qarah Sū and Qareh Sū; also known as Qara Sū) is a village in Kabud Gonbad Rural District, in the Central District of Kalat County, Razavi Khorasan Province, Iran. At the 2006 census, its population was 46, in 13 families.

References 

Populated places in Kalat County